The yellow-browed tit (Sylviparus modestus) is a species of bird in the family Paridae. It is placed in the monotypic genus Sylviparus.

It is found in the southern Himalayas, Northeast India and southern China with smaller amounts in Southeast Asia. Its natural habitats are subtropical or tropical moist lowland forest and subtropical or tropical moist montane forest.

References

yellow-browed tit
Birds of the Himalayas
Birds of Northeast India
Birds of China
Birds of Laos
Birds of Vietnam
Birds of Yunnan
yellow-browed tit
Taxonomy articles created by Polbot